Georg Stadler (born: 26 May 1961) is a sailor from Bad Ischl, Austria. who represented his country at the 1992 Summer Olympics in Barcelona, Spain as crew member in the Soling. With helmsman Michael Luschan and fellow crew member Stefan Lindner they took the 19th place.

References

Living people
1961 births
Sailors at the 1992 Summer Olympics – Soling
Olympic sailors of Austria
Austrian male sailors (sport)
People from Bad Ischl
Sportspeople from Upper Austria